Fathead is a brand name of life-sized, precision-cut vinyl wall graphics manufactured by Fathead LLC.   Fathead LLC is a privately held company based in Detroit, Michigan.  The ownership group is led by Dan Gilbert, who is chairman and founder of Quicken Loans, and also Majority Owner of the Cleveland Cavaliers.  Fathead categories include Real.Big, Fathead Jr., Fathead Customs, Fathead Tradeables, Fathead Teammate, Fathead Skins, and SM/ART across 650 officially licensed brands.  The products are high-definition wall graphics of professional athletes, animated heroes, entertainment characters, team helmets and logos.  The graphics are constructed of vinyl and a low-tack adhesive.

History 
In 2006, a group of investors, led by Dan Gilbert, founder of Quicken Loans, purchased Fathead, Inc.  Fathead was brought to Gilbert's attention by the company's president Todd Lunsford, then Quicken Loans’ Chief Marketing Officer, after Todd's son saw a commercial and wanted to order a Tom Brady Fathead. Today, Fathead, LLC is one of the threads in a large family of properties in the sports and entertainment market, including the National Basketball Association's Cleveland Cavaliers, the American Hockey League's Cleveland Monsters, Quicken Loans Arena, Xenith, Xeko and Veritix.

Awards and Recognitions 
 Named in Internet Retailer Hot 100 Retail Web Sites of 2008
 Named in Internet Retailer Hot 100 Retail Web Sites of 2009
 Named in Internet Retailer Top 500 of 2010
 Named in Detroit Free Press Top Work Places of 2010
 Named in Detroit Free Press Top Work Places of 2011
 Named in Detroit Free Press Top Work Places of 2012
 Named in Detroit Free Press Top Work Places of 2013
 Named in Internet Retailer as a Top 10 Mobile Site and Hot 100 Online Retail Site for 2014

References

External links 
 Official Fathead Website

Printing companies of the United States
Companies based in Detroit
Rock Ventures